Pentosidine is a biomarker for advanced glycation endproducts, or AGEs.  It is a well characterized and easily detected member of this large class of compounds.

Background
AGEs are biochemicals formed continuously under normal circumstances, but more rapidly under a variety of stresses, especially oxidative stress and hyperglycemia.  They serve as markers of stress and act as toxins themselves.  Pentosidine is typical of the class, except that it fluoresces, which allows it to be seen and measured easily.  Because it is well characterized, it is often studied to provide new insight into the biochemistry of AGE compounds in general.

Biochemistry
Derived from ribose, a pentose, pentosidine forms fluorescent cross-links between the arginine and lysine residues in collagen. It is formed in a reaction of the amino acids with the Maillard reaction products of ribose.

Although it is present only in trace concentrations among tissue proteins, it is useful for assessing cumulative damage to 
proteins—advanced glycation endproducts—by non-enzymatic browning reactions with carbohydrates.

Physiology
In vivo, AGEs form pentosidine through sugar fragmentation. In patients with diabetes mellitus type 2, pentosidine correlates with the presence and severity of diabetic complications.

References

Biomolecules
Guanidines
Imidazopyridines
Biomarkers